Yedgaon Dam, is an earthfill and gravity dam on Kukadi river near Junnar, Pune district, in the state of Maharashtra in India.

Specifications
The dam is located in the Ghod basin and is part of the Kukadi project, which constructed five dams in the region. Other dams included in this project are Wadaj Dam, Manikdoh Dam, Dimbhe Dam, and Pimpalgaon Joge Dam.

Purpose
 Irrigation
 Yedgoan is one of the top producer of tomatoes in Junnar.
Yedgon dam provide the strong water resource to the agricultural farming in the yedgaon village.

See also
 Dams in Maharashtra
 List of reservoirs and dams in India

References

Dams in Pune district
Dams completed in 1977
1977 establishments in Maharashtra
20th-century architecture in India